Gravesia is an extinct genus of ammonite known from the Upper Jurassic (Kimmeridgian-Tithonian stages) of Europe.

References 

Jurassic ammonites
Index fossils
Ammonitida genera